Jochen "Noel Pix" Seibert (25 March 1972) is a German rock and house musician, best known as the lead guitarist and programmer of Neue Deutsche Härte band Eisbrecher. He previously played guitar and keyboards for the band Megaherz. He releases his house tracks under the alias Housemaster Kinky J.

Noel Pix sings the German translations of theme songs for anime series like Pokémon, Digimon or Dragon Ball Z. He had one hit in the German, Austrian and Swiss singles chart: The theme song for the second season of Pokémon (Pokémon Welt) peaked at No. 50 in Germany, No. 30 in Austria and No. 49 in Switzerland.

Discography

Singles
Solo

 1996: "Kinky, Freaky, Funky" (as "Housemaster Kinky J")
 1999: "Chicci Chicci" (as "Noel Pix")
 2000: "Pokémon Welt" (as "Noel Pix")

Megaherz

 1998: "Liebestöter"
 1998: "Rock Me Amadeus"
 1999: "Freiflug"
 2000: "Himmelfahrt"

Eisbrecher

 2003: "Mein Blut"
 2003: "Fanatica"
 2006: "Leider"
 2006: "Leider/Vergissmeinnicht" (US limited double single)
 2006: "Vergissmeinnicht"
 2008: "Kann denn Liebe Sünde sein?"
 2010: "Eiszeit"
 2012: "Verrückt"
 2012: "Die Hölle muss warten"
 2012: "Miststück 2012"
 2013: "10 Jahre Eisbrecher"
 2014: "Zwischen uns"
 2015: "1000 Narben"
 2015: "Rot wie die Liebe"
 2017: "Was ist hier los?"

Albums
Megaherz

 1997: Wer bist du? – tracks 5 and 14
 1998: Kopfschuss – keyboards, guitar and programming
 2000: Himmelfahrt – keyboards, guitar and programming
 2001: Querschnitt – all tracks except 2, 4, 14, 16
 2002: Herzwerk II – thanked by the band in the credits
 2009: Totgesagte leben länger – tracks 2, 3, 8, 9, 12

Eisbrecher

 2004: Eisbrecher – instruments
 2006: Antikörper – instruments
 2008: Sünde – instruments
 2010: Eiszeit – instruments
 2012: Die Hölle muss warten – instruments
 2015: Schock – instruments
 2017: Sturmfahrt – instruments

Other

 Toggo United (album) (with other musicians as "Toggo United Allstars")

Soundtracks 

 Beyblade V-Force
 Dragon Ball Z Vol.1
 Dragon Ball Z Vol. 2
 Detective Conan
 Pokémon - Schnapp' sie dir alle!
 Pokémon 2 - Die Macht des Einzelnen
 Pokémon 3 - Der Ultimative Soundtrack
 Pretty Cure
 Monster Rancher
 Digimon - Digital Monsters
 Digimon - Digital Monsters Vol. 2
 Digimon - Digital Monsters Vol. 3
 Digimon - Digital Monsters Season 4
 One Piece
 Yu-Gi-Oh!

References

External links

 Official website (in German)

German house musicians
German rock singers
German rock guitarists
German male guitarists
Musicians from Munich
1972 births
Living people
21st-century German  male  singers
21st-century German guitarists